Mikhail Kedrov may refer to:

 Mikhail Kedrov (actor) (1894–1972), Soviet stage director, actor and theatrical educator
 Mikhail Kedrov (politician) (1878–1941), Soviet communist politician
 Mikhail Alexandrovich Kedrov (1878–1945), Russian naval officer